Graham Kerr (born 6 April 1934) is a former Australian rules footballer who played with Carlton and Melbourne in the Victorian Football League (VFL).

Kerr was a law student at Melbourne University, when Hawthorn recruited him from the University Blues. He spent two seasons playing for Carlton and then joined Melbourne. He didn't play a senior game in 1956 but won the Gardiner Medal in the league seconds.

References

1934 births
Australian rules footballers from Victoria (Australia)
Carlton Football Club players
Melbourne Football Club players
University Blues Football Club players
Living people
People educated at Melbourne Grammar School
Melbourne Law School alumni